Saturnalia was the 5th studio album released by The Wedding Present.  It was released in 1996.

Track listing

"Venus" - 1.53
"Real Thing" - 2.09
"Dreamworld" - 4.23
"2, 3, Go" - 5.13
"Snake Eyes" - 2.03
"Hula Doll" - 2.47
"Big Boots" - 3.45
"Montreal" - 3.06
"Skin Diving" - 3.10
"Jet Girl" - 2.21
"Kansas" - 2.53
"50s" - 4.58
"Up" - 2.53

References

The Wedding Present albums
1996 albums
Albums produced by Steve Fisk
Island Records albums